Kokkadicholai Thaanthonrichcharar Kovil (also known as Kokkadicholai Thanthonrichcharam) is the most significant Shaivism Kovil located in Kokkadicholai, 15km southwest Batticaloa District of Eastern Province, Sri Lanka. It is also one of the oldest and five most important Kovils in Sri Lanka and it is believed to be one of the two Kovils in Sri Lanka to have naturally built Sivalingam. The chariot festival of the temple is held annually usually in the month of September. One of the main chariots used in the festival was constructed with wooden sculptures in the 18th century.

History 
The temple is believed to have been originated in the 4th century BC and built by Ulaga Naachi who belonged to the Chola Empire. The temple is also well known for its miracles. One of them famously witnessed during the Portuguese era in Sri Lanka. A bull statue which is located inside the temple ate grass and chased the Portuguese soldiers away from the temple who were aiming to destroy the temple at that time.

References 

Hindu temples in Batticaloa District
History of Batticaloa District
Religious buildings and structures in Batticaloa
Siva temples in Sri Lanka
Dravidian architecture
Ancient Tamil Nadu
Chola architecture